Sixty Metonymies is the debut studio album of New York City-based avant-garde band Tartar Lamb. The album is essentially one 40-minute composition for a guitar-violin duo.

Track listing
 "Incensing the Malediction Is a Lamb" (11:47)
 "A Lamb in Hand's Worth Two in the Ewe" (3:13)
 "Trumpet Twine the Lamb Unhyne" (9:36)
 "The Lamb, the Ma'am, and the Holy Shim-Sham" (16:38)

Personnel
 Toby Driver – composition, electric guitar
 Mia Matsumiya – violin

Guest musicians
 Tim Byrnes – trumpet
 Andrew Greenwald – drums

References

2007 albums
Tartar Lamb (band) albums